The 2017 Malaysia Cup (Malay: Piala Malaysia 2017) was the 91st edition of the Malaysia Cup tournament organised by Football Association of Malaysia.

The 2017 Malaysia Cup began on August with a preliminary round. A total of 16 teams took part in the competition. The teams were divided into four groups, each containing four teams. The group leaders and runners-up teams in the groups after six matches qualified to the quarterfinals. 

Kedah were the defending champions.

The final was played at the Shah Alam Stadium in Shah Alam on 4 November 2017. It was the eleventh time that final has been held in Shah Alam, Selangor. The final was contested by the defending champions, Kedah, and Johor Darul Ta'zim. Johor Darul Ta'zim won the match 2–0, with goals from Aidil Zafuan and Gonzalo Cabrera. With that win, Johor Darul Ta'zim secured their second trophy of the 2017 season after successfully retaining the Super League title.

Format 
In the competition, the top eleven teams from the First Round of 2017 Malaysia Super League were joined by the top five teams from the First Round of 2017 Malaysia Premier League. The teams were drawn into four groups of four teams.

Number of teams by states

Round and draw dates
The draw for the 2017 Malaysia Cup was held on 22 May 2017 at Sri Pentas, Persiaran Bandar Utama, Petaling Jaya on live telecast Scoreboard Extra Time with the participating team coaches and captains in attendance.

Seeding

Group stage

Group A

Group B

Group C

Group D

Knockout stage

In the knockout stage, teams played against each other over two legs on a home-and-away basis, except for the one-match final. The mechanism of the draws for each round was as follows:
In the draw for the quarter final, the fourth group winners were seeded, and the fourth group runners-up were unseeded. The seeded teams were drawn against the unseeded teams, with the seeded teams hosting the second leg. Teams from the same group or the same association could not be drawn against each other.
In the draws for the quarter-finals onwards, there were no seedings, and teams from the same group or the same association could be drawn against each other.

Bracket

Quarter-finals

Semi-finals

Final

The final were played on 4 November 2017 at the Shah Alam Stadium in Selangor, Malaysia.

Statistics

Top goalscorers

Own goals

Clean sheets

Hat-tricks

References

External links
Football Malaysia Official Website - (Malaysia Cup)

2017 in Malaysian football
Malaysia Cup seasons
Malaysia Cup